Pyloetis is a moth genus, belonging to the family  Tineidae. It consists of only one species, Pyloetis mimosae, which is found in Asia, including Japan and Taiwan.

The wingspan is about 15 mm.

The larvae feed within seed pods of Leucaena leucocephala and Acacia nilotica.

References

Myrmecozelinae
Monotypic moth genera
Moths of Asia